Astcote is a hamlet near the town of Towcester in Northamptonshire, England. It is in the civil parish of Pattishall.

The settlement was recorded in the Domesday Book under the name of Aviescote.

References

External links
 

Hamlets in Northamptonshire
West Northamptonshire District